Farshid Moussavi  (born in 1965, Shiraz, Iran) is an Iranian-born British architect, educator, and author. She is the founder of Farshid Moussavi Architecture (FMA) and a Professor in Practice of Architecture at Harvard University Graduate School of Design. Before forming FMA, she was co-founder of the London-based Foreign Office Architects or FOA (1993-2011), recognised as one of the world's most creative design firms, integrating architecture, urban design, and landscape architecture in a wide range of projects internationally. Moussavi was elected a Royal Academician in 2015, and subsequently, Professor of Architecture at the RA Schools in 2017. She was appointed Officer of the Order of the British Empire (OBE) in the 2018 Queen's Birthday Honours for Services to Architecture.

Early life and education
Moussavi was born in 1965 in Shiraz, Iran and immigrated to London in 1979 to attend boarding school. She trained in architecture at the Dundee School of Architecture, University of Dundee, the Bartlett School of Architecture, University College London and graduated with a Masters in Architecture (MArch II) from the Harvard University Graduate School of Design (GSD). While at the Harvard, Moussavi met architect Alejandro Zaera-Polo.

Career 
Moussavi first came to prominence with Foreign Office Architects (FOA), the practice she co-founded in 1993 with her ex-husband Alejandro Zaera-Polo. At FOA, Moussavi co-authored the design for the award-winning Yokohama International Ferry Terminal in Japan (which was subject to an international design competition in 1995) and was part of the United Architects team who were finalists in the Ground Zero competition. She also completed a wide range of international projects including the John Lewis complex in Leicester, England and the Meydan retail complex in Istanbul, Turkey.

In June 2011 after splitting with Zaera-Polo, Moussavi re-established her own London-based practice, Farshid Moussavi Architecture (FMA). Her notable projects with FMA include the Museum of Contemporary Art Cleveland, Victoria Beckham's Flagship Store in London, a residential complex in the La Défense-Nanterre district of Paris, a multi-story residential building in Montpellier, and the Harrods Toys Department in London. The practice is currently working on a number of high-profile projects including The Ismaili Center Houston in the USA. It was a finalist for London National Portrait Gallery competition, and joint winner of the international competition for the new headquarters of the International Olympic Committee (IOC) in Lausanne.

Research
Alongside her professional practice, Moussavi has held a longstanding commitment to research across the academic and professional field of architecture. Since 2005, she has been Professor in Practice at Harvard University Graduate School of Design. Previously, Moussavi taught at the Architectural Association in London for eight years (1993–2000), and was subsequently appointed as Head of the Academy of Fine Arts in Vienna (2002–2005). She has been a visiting professor of architecture at the Berlage Institute in Rotterdam, the Hoger Architectuur Instituut Sint-Lucas in Gent, and in the US, at UCLA, Columbia University and Princeton University.

Moussavi's research, which began while teaching at the Architectural Association in the early 90s, has focused on instruments that allow architects to embed built forms with design intelligence and creative possibilities – such as the diagram, information technology, new construction technologies, envelopes and tessellation – and how they can be used to develop alternative concepts for the practice of architecture.

Since 2004, Moussavi's research has focused predominantly on the relationship between the construction and experience of a built form, and how the architect's agency is to navigate the many choices provided by the design process to give built forms the unique propensities which individuals experience as affect. Her work in aesthetics is influenced by a range of philosophers, notably Spinoza, Gilles Deleuze and Félix Guattari, and Jacques Rancière. Following from Gilles Deleuze's work on affect, she proposes that built forms' affects play an active role in the daily experiences of individuals and the affections they develop. Moussavi argues that, in order to move people's experience away from routine and to open up the possibility for new types of action, architects need to provide built forms with novel affects. It is not what built forms represent but how they provide experiences that would otherwise not exist that makes their aesthetic experience relevant and gives their architecture a function or agency in culture.

Moussavi has published three books: The Function of Ornament, The Function of Form and The Function of Style in conjunction with her teaching at Harvard, all of which disclaim architecture's traditional binary oppositions – form vs.function, structure vs. form, ornament vs. function, style vs. function – proposing that architecture's creative potential lies, rather, in finding ways to relate them to one other.

Select projects

Farshid Moussavi Architecture
2019 – Present: Ismaili Cultural Center, Houston, USA
2018 – Harrods Toys Department, London, England
2017 – Residential Complex, La Défense-Nanterre, Paris, France
2017 – Les Jardins de la Lironde Residential Complex, Montpellier, France
2016 – Victoria Beckham Flagship Store, London, England
2012 – Museum of Contemporary Art, Cleveland, Ohio
2012 – Installation for Common Ground at 13th Venice Architecture Biennale, Venice, Italy

Foreign Office Architects
2010 – Ravensbourne Design and Communication College, London, UK
2007 – Carabanchel Social Housing, Madrid, Spain
2000 – 2008 – John Lewis department store and Cineplex and pedestrian bridges, Leicester, England
2004 – South-East Costal Park and Auditoriums, Barcelona, Spain
2002 – British Pavilion at the 8th Venice Architecture Biennale Next. Venice, Italy
2002 – Yokohama International Port Terminal, Yokohama, Japan

Awards
This is a select list of Moussavi and Foreign Office Architects (FOA) awards.

Publications

Books

Articles 

Moussavi, Farshid (2012). “30 St. Mary Axe”. Harvard Design Magazine, Volume 35, USA.
Moussavi, Farshid (2012) An Archeological Approach, Instigations: Engaging Architecture, Landscape, and the City (2012) GSD075, Edited by Mohsen Mostafavi and Peter Christensen in cooperation with Harvard University Graduate School of Design.

2018 Project Interrupted: Lectures by British Housing Architects, The Architecture Foundation, UK.
Moussavi, Farshid (2022). The Function of Ornament in the Ismaili Center Houston in The Clamor of Ornament: Exchange, Power, and Joy from the Fifteenth Century to the Present. Published by The Drawing Center, NY.

References

External links

 
 FunctionLab website, the research arm of Farshid Moussavi Architecture.
 Farshid Moussavi profile at Harvard University, Graduate School of Design
 Farshid Moussavi profile, Royal Academician
 Profile on Royal Academy of Arts Collections
 Royal Academy Schools 
 Norman Foster Foundation

Video links 
Farshid Moussavi in conversation with Nader Tehrani lecture video at Harvard University, 2012
The Function of Style lecture video at Harvard GSD, 2015
Style Agency lecture video at Harvard GSD, 2012
New Models of Research lecture video at Harvard GSD, 2015
Farshid Moussavi at IACC Lecture Series 2010/2011
Farshid Moussavi lecture at the Pavillon de l'Arsenal, 12 November 2007

1965 births
Living people
Academic staff of the Academy of Fine Arts Vienna
British architects
British women architects
Iranian emigrants to the United Kingdom
Alumni of the University of Dundee
Harvard Graduate School of Design faculty
Harvard Graduate School of Design alumni
Royal Academicians
People from Shiraz
Alumni of University College London
20th-century Iranian women
21st-century Iranian women
20th-century British women
21st-century British women